Senator Whelan may refer to:

Eugene Whelan (1924–2013), Senate of Canada
Jim Whelan (1948–2017), New Jersey State Senate
John Whelan (Irish politician) (born 1961), Senate of Ireland
John W. Whelan (1845–1906), Wisconsin State Senate

See also
Senator Whalen (disambiguation)